The Vache is an estate near Chalfont St Giles in Buckinghamshire, England. Located within the estate is a monument dedicated to the memory of Captain James Cook (1728–1779), the explorer. It has been owned or occupied by, among others, George Fleetwood, regicide of Charles I.

History
The Vache was the family seat of the Fleetwoods. Thomas Fleetwood , the younger son of a provincial family, made his fortune by serving in the London Mints (as comptroller, assayer, commissioner for new coinage, under treasurer, etc.) He was granted the family's arms on 4 July 1548  The profits from the appointments enabled him to buy the Vache in 1564. He was a Member (MP) of the Parliament of England for Buckinghamshire in 1563 and was pricked High Sheriff of Bedfordshire and Buckinghamshire for 1564–65. The Vache estate passed to the second of his sons, George Fleetwood (1564-1620), also an MP.

The estate descended via George's son Charles (died 1628) to another George Fleetwood (1623–1672), a major-general and one of the regicides of King Charles. In 1660 George Fleetwood was found guilty of killing the king, and although his life was spared, his estate of The Vache was confiscated and given to the then Duke of York, the future King James II. 

The Vache (then spelled Vatche) was part of the dowry of Mary Margaret Alston, who married Rev Dr Francis Hare at St Paul's Cathedral in 1728. The couple lived there, bringing up their seven children while the bishop wrote the books that made his name. He died in 1740 and was buried in a mausoleum in the local church. Their eldest son, Robert (named after Robert Walpole), had the Vache settled on him when he came of age; it is mentioned in his 1752 marriage settlement with Sarah Selman. He became a Prebendary Canon of Winchester Cathedral, and, as he also owned Herstmonceux Castle, nearer to the city, he decided to sell the Vache in the 1770s. The estate was acquired by Admiral Sir Hugh Palliser. Following Palliser's death in 1796, the building passed to his son and was then sold to Thomas Allen in 1826; the house passed down the Allen family until it was sold to James Robertson in 1902.
 
After the Second World War, homelessness and overcrowding sparked a nationwide movement of squatting. One of the first of these occurred at The Vache in September 1946. The leader was an ex-Commando, John Mann, of Chalfont St. Giles, who had been sharing a small cottage with his wife, his five-year-old son, and ten strangers. At the local pub one night, Mann heard a Polish captain say that a deserted army camp at nearby Vache Park was being readied for Polish soldiers of General Władysław Anders's army in exile. Mann decided to get there first. At dawn, he and a handful of homeless veterans bloodlessly routed three Polish guards and seized Vache Park. Next day, 120 families had moved into the spacious army huts. After a flurry of resistance, local authorities capitulated.

Captain James Cook monument

The Vache is the site of a monument to Captain James Cook, erected by Admiral Sir Hugh Palliser.

Notes

References

 

Buildings and structures in Buckinghamshire
Geography of Buckinghamshire
Country estates in England
Monuments and memorials to James Cook
Squatting in the United Kingdom